The 1972 NCAA Division I men's lacrosse tournament was the second annual NCAA Division I Men's Lacrosse Championship tournament. This was the last NCAA championship in which the Wingate Memorial Trophy was also presented to the national champion.  Prior to NCAA Lacrosse Championships, the United States Intercollegiate Lacrosse Association (USILA) awarded the Wingate Memorial Trophy to the NCAA annual champion based on regular season records.

Tournament overview
The 1972 NCAA Division I tournament championship game was played at University of Maryland in front of 7,001 fans. As in 1971, teams were first selected from the college lacrosse divisions, and then at-large teams were chosen. Army, Navy, Maryland and Johns Hopkins were selected as "seeded" picks. And Virginia, Cortland, Rutgers and Washington & Lee were picked as the at-large teams.

The Virginia Cavaliers led by coach Glenn Thiel (future head coach at Penn State) with an 11-4 record, defeated Johns Hopkins 13 to 12. Virginia had USILA player of the year Pete Eldredge, who finished with four goals in the finals scoring the game winner with four minutes left in the fourth quarter.

Maryland, the pre-tournament favorite and host team, fell in the semifinals to Johns Hopkins, 9-6, before 8,000 fans.

The victory gave Virginia its first NCAA national title in lacrosse, but it was the school's third overall lacrosse title including USILA titles in 1952 and 1970. The victory also gave Virginia its first official NCAA national title in any sport, as the NCAA only unofficially recognizes Virginia's national championship in boxing from 1938. The Cavaliers had lost to Hopkins, Maryland and Navy during the regular season.

The Cavaliers survived a late rush by Jack Thomas, who with 12 seconds left in the game appeared to have a clear shot at the net. Bob Scott however had, unknown to the ball players called a timeout, negating what would have been a last-second game-tying attempt.

This tournament saw the entry in the tournament of two early innovative lacrosse programs, Cortland State and Washington and Lee. Cortland was notable for going 14-2 that season while knocking off defending champion Cornell, Syracuse and Navy, and earning the number 3 seed in the tournament. Cortland was coached by Jack Emmer who later took Washington and Lee to consecutive NCAAs before moving on to be the longtime coach at Army.

Paced by veterans Jay Connor, Tom Duquette, Pete Eldredge and Chip Barker as well as freshman Richie Werner, Virginia got the winning goal from Eldredge, unassisted with 4:11 left in the contest. Maryland, the pre-tourney favorite, fell in the semifinals to Johns Hopkins 9–6. Connor, the tourney’s leading scorer, set a meet record for assists. Maryland’s John Kaestner broke the single-game assist mark. Virginia and Johns Hopkins combined to shatter all three of the tournament records for shots on goal.

In the first round, Jack Emmer's Cortland team edged Navy 10 to 9 in double overtime, led by Paul Wehrum's 3 goals. Cortland scored three goals in the fourth quarter to erase a 9–6 deficit and won the game despite being outshot by Navy 57–28.

Tournament bracket

(ii) two overtimes

Tournament boxscores
Tournament Finals

Tournament Semi-Finals

Tournament Quarterfinals

Tournament outstanding player

Jay Connor,  Virginia, 13 points, Tournament Leading Scorer

 The NCAA did not designate a Most Outstanding Player until the 1977 national tournament.  The Tournament outstanding player listed here is the tournament leading scorer.

References

External links
 Jun 5, 1972 – Virginia Wins Lacrosse Title
 Sports Illustrated write up Title Game page 32

NCAA Division I Men's Lacrosse Championship
NCAA Division I Men's Lacrosse Championship
NCAA Division I Men's Lacrosse Championship
NCAA Division I Men's Lacrosse Championship
NCAA Division I Men's Lacrosse Championship
NCAA Division I Men's Lacrosse Championship